The 1679 Armenia earthquake (also called Yerevan earthquake or Garni earthquake) took place on June 4 in the Yerevan region of Armenia, then part of the Safavid Iran.

Numerous buildings were destroyed as a result of the earthquake. In Yerevan  most notable structures were damaged. The Yerevan Fortress was destroyed, so were the following churches: Poghos-Petros, Katoghike, Zoravor and the Gethsemane Chapel.

Furthermore, the nearby Kanaker village was destroyed. The classical Hellenistic Temple of Garni also collapsed. Among many churches and monasteries that were reduced to ruins were Havuts Tar, Saint Sargis Monastery of Ushi,  Hovhannavank, Geghard, and Khor Virap.

See also
Iranian Armenia (1502–1828)
List of earthquakes in Armenia
List of historical earthquakes

References

Further reading

Earthquakes in Armenia
17th century in Armenia
Armenia earthquake
Yerevan
Armenia earthquake
Armenia earthquake